Seán Liddy (20 September 1890 – 30 March 1965) was an Irish politician and founder member of the Garda Síochána. On his retirement, he also founded and became the first President of the Garda Pensioners Association (1961–1966), later to be renamed the Garda Síochána Retired Members Association (GSRMA).

One of seven children, Liddy was born as John Liddy in Dangarnella, County Clare on 20 September 1890, the son of farmer John Liddy and Margaret Donnellan. He was married in Dublin on 27 September 1922 to Anna Breen.

Alongside lifelong friend Michael Collins, he was a prominent veteran of the Irish War of Independence. Subsequently, he served as a Teachta Dála (TD), Army Officer and Garda Chief Superintendent.

In the 1921 elections, he was elected unopposed to the 2nd Dáil as a Sinn Féin TD for the constituency of Clare. He supported the Anglo-Irish Treaty and voted in favour of it. He was re-elected unopposed as a pro-Treaty Sinn Féin TD at the 1922 general election. He resigned as a TD on 18 December 1922.

He died as a result of a motor accident on 30 March 1965.

The Liddy Medal – the Garda Veterans Injury Award – is named in his memory. The medal is presented to retired Gardaí who were injured in the line of duty while in the force.

References

1890 births
1965 deaths
Garda Síochána officers
Early Sinn Féin TDs
Members of the 2nd Dáil
Members of the 3rd Dáil
Politicians from County Clare
People of the Irish Civil War (Pro-Treaty side)